Maoupa Cedric Maake (born 1965), known as The Wemmer Pan Killer, is a South African serial killer who was convicted of 27 murders but was suspected of killing many more.

Biography 
Cedric Maake’s father died when he was in Standard 8 (now ‘Grade 10’). He then decided to leave school at that time to help care for his family. He moved to Johannesburg to look for work and became a plumber, working for himself. Maake had a wife and four children in Limpopo and a girlfriend in Johannesburg. At 33 years old he was living in La Rochelle, Johannesburg when seemingly without a trigger he began a life of crime. He committed at least 27 murders throughout 1996 and 1997.

Crimes 

Maake is known as the "Wemmer Pan Killer" because it was in the Wemmer Pan area of Johannesburg that he targeted most of his victims, beginning in April 1996. At first the Brixton Murder and Robbery Unit of the South African Police Service (SAPS), the unit primarily responsible for investigation of serial killers in the Johannesburg Police Area, did not link his crimes together, believing that they were the work of two separate serial killers due to the difference in patterns between the murders. During the investigation of Maake's murders, two separate criminal profiles were created; one for the "Wemmer Pan" murderer and one for "Hammer" murders.

On the 28th of December 1996, Antonio Alfonso was working in Hill Gardens Café in High Street, Rosettenville. Maake entered the café and without warning attacked Alfonso with a hammer. He stole R400 from the cash register and fled. Alfonso survived the attack. Maake used his ill-gotten gains to celebrate the new year and on the 6th of January 1997. On a morning, around 10:00, Maake entered and robbed a shop owned by Magan Khanjee where he struck Khanjee, until he was unconscious, with a shifting spanner and stole five pairs of trousers from the shop.

Two days later, Maake bludgeoned Kenny Chan with a hammer and stole money from the till. His crimes only got worse. He struck Khantilal Lutchman with a hammer and stole his wallet in a tailor shop. The same incident happened to a Abdul Bulbulia in Newtown. His first murder victim was Dhansuklal Patel who died in hospital after Maake bludgeoned him with a hammer and stole his wallet.

The Wemmer Pan murders involved several patterns of victims. The first were men and women walking alone who Maake bludgeoned to death with rocks. The second group of Wemmer Pan victims were couples in cars around the Wemmer Pan area whom Maake would assault, shooting the men and raping the women.

The second criminal profile the police created involved murders of tailors in the inner city area, killed in their shops with hammers. The connection between the Wemmer Pan murders and the Hammer killings were made by Superintendent Piet Byleveld on 12 January 1998. Maake took Byleveld to a pawn shop in La Rochelle in the south of Johannesburg where he had sold the bicycle of Gerhard Lavoo, a victim in the Wemmer Pan murders, for R 120. The alias he used on the receipt was "Patrick Mokwena", the same alias he had used to check in a shirt at one of the tailors before Maake murdered him.

Arrest
Maake was arrested in December 1997 as a suspect of the "Wemmer Pan" murders and initially acknowledged responsibility for the crimes. He cooperated with police officers on several occasions to lead them around the vicinity and point out the locations of his crimes. The data generated by this was later used with Geographic Information Systems (GIS) and crime mapping technology to provide diagrams of the geographical extent of the serial murders. The Wemmer Pan serial killer trial was one of the earliest uses of GIS to aid in court prosecution by the SAPS. Geographic profiling later revealed that the majority of Maake's murders were centered on his two residences, the place where he worked, and the residences of his brother and girlfriend.

Maake was charged with 36 counts of murder, 28 attempted murders, 15 counts of rape, 46 counts of aggravated robbery, and other offenses relating to the unlawful possession of firearms and ammunition. In court Maake pleaded not guilty to all charges. One month after his arrest he confessed to the "Hammer" murders.

On September 6, 2000, he was convicted of 27 murders, 26 attempted murders, 14 rapes, 41 aggravated robberies and many more less serious offenses. He was found guilty of 114 of 134 charges in all and was sentenced to 27 life sentences (one life sentence for each murder) plus 1159 years and 3 months imprisonment. In total, his sentence amounted to 1,340 years in prison.

In media
Cedric Maake was featured in a 13-part M-Net television series called Criminal Minds hosted by Malcolm Gooding.

See also
List of serial killers by country
List of serial killers by number of victims

References

1964 births
Coloured South African people
Living people
Male serial killers
People convicted of murder by South Africa
Prisoners sentenced to life imprisonment by South Africa
South African people convicted of murder
South African prisoners sentenced to life imprisonment
South African people convicted of rape
South African rapists
South African serial killers